The sugarcane aphid, (Melanaphis sacchari), is an aphid in the superfamily Aphidoidea in the order Hemiptera. It is a true bug and sucks sap from plants. It is mostly found in Saccharum and Sorghum species. The species primarily reproduces via parthenogenesis, although sexual morphs have been discovered in China, Japan, and Mexico - in China the eggs overwinter in the host Miscanthus sacchariflorus.

References 

 
 http://www.tsusinvasives.org/database/sugar-aphid.html
 
 
 http://www.plantwise.org/KnowledgeBank/Datasheet.aspx?dsid=33256

Aphidini
Agricultural pest insects
Hemiptera of Asia
Insect pests of millets
Insects described in 1897